Nilandhoo as a place name may refer to:
 Nilandhoo (Faafu Atoll) (Republic of Maldives)
 Nilandhoo (Gaafu Alif Atoll) (Republic of Maldives)